Filip Halgoš (born 9 March 1998) is a Slovak football midfielder who currently plays for FK Viktoria Žižkov.

Club career

AS Trenčín
Halgoš made his professional Fortuna Liga debut for AS Trenčín against MFK Ružomberok on 21 August 2016.

References

External links
 AS Trenčín official club profile
 
 Futbalnet profile

1998 births
Living people
Slovak footballers
Slovak expatriate footballers
Association football midfielders
AS Trenčín players
MFK Tatran Liptovský Mikuláš players
FK Viktoria Žižkov players
FK Železiarne Podbrezová players
Slovak Super Liga players
2. Liga (Slovakia) players
Czech National Football League players
Sportspeople from Trenčín
Slovak expatriate sportspeople in the Czech Republic
Expatriate footballers in the Czech Republic